The 1978 Berlin Marathon was the 5th running of the annual marathon race held in Berlin, West Germany, held on 3 September. West Germany's Michael Spöttel won the men's race in 2:20:02 hours, while the women's race was won by West Germany's Ursula Blaschke in 2:57:09. A total of 197 runners finished the race, comprising 187 men and 10 women.

Results

Men

Women

References 

 Results. Association of Road Racing Statisticians. Retrieved 2020-06-24.
 Berlin Marathon results archive. Berlin Marathon. Retrieved 2020-06-24.

External links 
 Official website

1978
Berlin Marathon
1970s in West Berlin
Berlin Marathon
Berlin Marathon